The George Griswold Frelinghuysen Arboretum (127 acres) is an arboretum located at 353 East Hanover Avenue, Morris Township, New Jersey. It is open daily without charge. It is also the headquarters of the Morris County Parks Commission.

The arboretum features thematic collections of plant life, including ornamental grasses, spring-blooming shrubs and perennials, summer shrubs and cutbacks, fall fruit and foliage, shade trees, and a garden called the "promising plants garden" which has underused plants supplied by nurseries, growers, and breeders. In front of the large main house there is the Great Lawn, a large gently sloping manicured grassy expanse in the style of an English county manor landscape; it is the site of outdoor concerts in the warmer months. There are different nature and horse trails. There is a Braille Nature Trail in a small wooded hollow just off the Great Lawn which was designed for hands-on exploration. The Kathryn A. Porter "Branching Out!" Garden is worked on by children ages 5–13 during a spring after-school and summer program; the course of study includes cooking and crafts. Participants grow vegetables, herbs, and flowers to take home. The Patriots' Path is a network of hiking, biking, and equestrian trails and green open spaces, and links to other parks in New Jersey.


Background

The arboretum surrounds the Frelinghuysens' Colonial Revival mansion and its formal gardens, and features nature trails with labeled trees and shrubs.
The arboretum was established on the site of Whippany Farm, owned by George Griswold Frelinghuysen (1851-1936), son of Frederick T. Frelinghuysen, and a New York City patent attorney and president of Ballantine Brewing Company from 1905 until his retirement, and Sara Ballantine (1858-1940) of Newark, New Jersey, granddaughter of the founder Peter Ballantine of the Ballantine Brewing Company. In 1920, Mrs. Sara Ballantine planted roses, and the rose beds were laid out between the spokes of a Chippendale style brick wall set in a basket weave pattern. In 1964 their daughter, Matilda Frelinghuysen (1887-1969) began plans to turn the estate into an arboretum. Today's Frelinghuysen Arboretum was dedicated in 1971.

See also 
 List of botanical gardens in the United States

References

External links 
 

Frelinghuysen family residences
Arboreta in New Jersey
Botanical gardens in New Jersey
Morristown, New Jersey
Arboretum
Parks in Morris County, New Jersey
Houses in Morris County, New Jersey
County parks in New Jersey
Braille trail sites